Merriam Peak is a  mountain summit located in Fresno County in the Sierra Nevada mountain range in northern California, United States. It is situated south of the Royce Lakes and north of French Canyon, in the John Muir Wilderness, on land managed by Sierra National Forest. Merriam Peak is the 129th highest summit in California. This mountain was named in 1929 by the California State Geographic Board, and officially adopted in 1930 by the U.S. Board on Geographic Names to honor Dr. Clinton Hart Merriam (1855–1942), an American zoologist and naturalist, who served on the U.S. Board on Geographic Names from 1914 through 1925.

Climate
According to the Köppen climate classification system, Merriam Peak is located in an alpine climate zone. Most weather fronts originate in the Pacific Ocean, and travel east toward the Sierra Nevada mountains. As fronts approach, they are forced upward by the peaks, causing them to drop their moisture in the form of rain or snowfall onto the range (orographic lift). Precipitation runoff from this mountain drains south into tributaries of the South Fork San Joaquin River.

Climbing
The first ascent of the summit was made July 14, 1933, by Sierra Club members Lewis Clark, Julie Mortimer, and Ted Waller. They called it "Bastille Peak" in honor of the July 14th French holiday, Bastille Day, unaware that it had previously been named.  Class 3 scrambles can be made via the east, south, and southwest aspects. The North Buttress is considered one of the classic climbing routes in the Sierra Nevada.

Established rock climbing routes:

 North Buttress  –  – 1976 by Vern Clevenger, Bob Harrington
 The Flying Buttress  – class 5.11b – 2011 by Peter Croft, Lisa Rands
 Gargoyle – class 5.11b – 2011 by Peter Croft, Lisa Rands

Gallery

See also

List of mountain peaks of California

References

External links
 Weather forecast: Merriam Peak
 Merriam Peak rock climbing: Mountain Project

Sierra National Forest
Mountains of Fresno County, California
Mountains of the John Muir Wilderness
North American 3000 m summits
Mountains of Northern California
Sierra Nevada (United States)